Voinești is a commune in Iași County, Western Moldavia, Romania. It is composed of five villages: Lungani, Schitu Stavnic, Slobozia, Vocotești and Voinești.

References

Communes in Iași County
Localities in Western Moldavia